Annois is a commune in the department of Aisne in the Hauts-de-France region of northern France.

Geography
Annois is located some 33 km northwest of Laon and 30 km east of Roye. It is accessed by road D937 from Cugny in the west and continuing east to Flavy-le-Martel.  There is also the D32 from Saint-Simon to Flavy-le-Martel passing through the northeast of the commune. Branching from this road is the D431 which goes to the village. A railway line passes through the heart of the commune from west to east but the nearest station is the Flavy-le-Martel station outside the eastern border of the commune. The commune is mostly farmland with some forest on the northern and southern edges of the commune.

The Canal de Saint-Quentin passes just to the north of the commune and there are large ponds in the north of the commune connected to the canal. A stream flows through the length of the commune from south to north connecting to the network of ponds.

Neighbouring communes and villages

Administration

List of Mayors of Annois

Population

Personalities
Charles Augustus Pinguet (also called Badinguet) was born in Annois on 1 July 1826. On 1 February 1840 aged 14 he began working as a "cad" (valet service in the army) working as a painter on the maintenance of the Château de Ham. He became a friend of Prince Louis Napoleon Bonaparte during his imprisonment there for six years.  On 25 May 1846 the future Napoleon III dressed in Pinguet's clothes: blue pants, blue cloth coat, hat, and shoes.  Pinguet gave him a board soiled with lime mortar and plaster. On 25 May 1846 at six in the morning, Napoleon's escape began and he was in England by the next day.

See also 
 Communes of the Aisne department

References

External links
 Annois on the old National Geographic Institute website 
Annois on Géoportail, National Geographic Institute (IGN) website 
Annoy on the 1750 Cassini Map

Communes of Aisne